Tzippori is a moshav in northern Israel, in the Lower Galilee. The moshav is within the jurisdiction of the Jezreel Valley Regional Council. The moshav was founded 3km southeast of the ancient settlement of Sepphoris, after which it was named.

History

The moshav was established in 1949 on the land of the depopulated Palestinian town of Saffuriya; 3km SE of the village site.

The moshav was established with the assistance of the Jewish Agency for Israel and the Moshavim Movement.

In the early 2000s an additional neighborhood was added.

Notable residents
Boaz Ellis, fencer
Amir Segal, poet

References

 
Moshavim
Populated places established in 1949
Populated places in Northern District (Israel)